KJ1 F·T·O (KJ1 Funky Town Osaka) is the first full-length album released by the Japanese boyband Kanjani Eight.The album features a full 14 tracks that dabble in generic pop, rock, and Enka. Majority of the songs off of the album split the group in units, such as "Hatenaki Sora" being a Shota Yasuda/Ryo Nishikido duet and "Carnival" being a Ryuhei Maruyama/Tadayoshi Okura duet, among others.

Musically, the album is almost completely pop with only two songs passing off into the Enka/Kayokyoku genre of Japanese music. Despite this, the album was categorized as an Enka album and as such the album ranked on the Oricon's general music charts as well as the Enka/Kayokyoku charts. This allowed the group to achieve a record of being the first Enka artist to have two consecutive releases reach the top 5 of the Enka/Kayokyoku charts and be the first Enka artist in 32 years to reach the top 3 general music charts.

CD Track listing

Limited Edition

The limited edition release of F·T·O also featured a DVD showcasing the backstage footage from their F·T·O.N concert tour.

Regular Edition

The regular edition of the album contained the tracks listed for the limited edition release, as well as two additional tracks from the sub-unit, SanKyouDai

Charting

References

2006 albums
Kanjani Eight albums